The Bende are a Bantu ethnic group based in the Mpanda District of the Katavi Region in western Tanzania.  In 2009, the Bende population was estimated to number 41,290.

See also
 List of ethnic groups in Tanzania

References

Further reading
 Yuko Abe A Bende Vocabulary. Research Institute for Languages and Cultures of Asia and Africa (ILCAA).  Tokyo University of Foreign Studies. 2006.

Ethnic groups in Tanzania